Holon is an album by Swiss pianist and composer Nik Bärtsch's band Ronin recorded in France in 2007 and released on the ECM label.

Reception

The Allmusic review by Thom Jurek states "The most beautiful thing about Holon is how "live" it all feels. You can see in the mind's eye and fully hear this music in a setting where an audience is urging the band on, not just listening, but moving. How much better does it get than that? The more things stay the same in Ronin, the more they change".

Track listing
All compositions by Nik Bärtsch
 "Modul 42" - 6:29   
 "Modul 41_17" - 14:51   
 "Modul 39_8" - 7:49   
 "Modul 46" - 7:16   
 "Modul 45" - 9:41   
 "Modul 44" - 9:23

Personnel
 Nik Bärtsch — piano, electric piano
 Sha - alto saxophone, bass clarinet, contrabass clarinet
 Björn Meyer — 6-string bass 
 Kaspar Rast - drums 
 Andi Pupato — percussion

References

ECM Records albums
Nik Bärtsch albums
2008 albums
Albums produced by Manfred Eicher